D Block is a 2022 Indian Tamil-language coming-of-age psychological thriller film directed by debutant Vijay Kumar Rajendran (Eruma saani fame) and produced by cinematographer Aravinnd Singh under the banner MNM Films and presented by Sakthi Film Factory. The film stars Arulnithi and Avantika Mishra with a supporting cast including Karu Palaniappan, Charandeep, Thalaivasal Vijay, Ramesh Khanna and Uma Riyaz Khan. The film's soundtrack and background score are composed by Ron Ethan Yohann and Kaushik Krish respectively, with cinematography handled by Aravinnd Singh himself and editing done by Ganesh Siva. The film was released in theatres on 1 July 2022. The film received mixed to positive reviews from critics and audience with praise for Arulnithi's performance, cinematography, background score and plot but criticized the screenplay and pacing. In December, 2022, the Hindi dubbed version of the movie, under the same name, was released.

Plot 
The film takes place at an isolated university in the middle of the Coimbatore forest. The hostels for students are nearby and the women's hostel, D Block, is in the middle of the forest.

Swathi, a first-year class leader, sees something disturbing and informs her friends. However, they pacify her and believe that she had imagined it. Later, when she visits the hostel terrace, she is dragged away by an unknown figure. In the morning, she is found dead.

The university administration covers up the cause of her death as a tiger attack, and the principal bribes the police. Meanwhile, Maya, a senior student, meets with Arul and his friends and shows them a drawing of her friend Poornima. Poornima's picture was drawn 4 years ago, but exactly matches Swathi's drawing. Maya suggests that there is someone behind the death, but Arul and his friends refuses to accept it.

One night, Arul and his friends sneak into D Block to meet with Arul's girlfriend, Shruti, on her birthday. They see a terrifying figure on the roof of D Block and become scared. When they attempt to inform the college administration, the principal and warden refuse to believe them.

Arul, his friends and Maya decide to investigate the mystery themselves. They discover that eight other female students had died in the same way as Swathi. One of the dead girls was the daughter of a security guard who had previously worked at the university. Arul and his friend go to see the guard, and find the girl is alive, but mentally ill. The watchman tells them that the deaths in the university were not caused by a tiger, but by something else.

The friends approach a cafeteria worker at the university to learn more about the past. The cafeteria worker tells them that a person named Kaali had peeked into girl's washroom while a girl is showering and was brutally hit by college boys and was sent to police station. The inspector while getting his details recognized he is the same Kaali, who had suffered from mental illness since childhood, had been involved in the construction of D Block. As a child, Kali had kidnapped and killed two girls. Three other girls were also later abducted and two of them were killed. The surviving girl had identified Kali as the killer, and the police had arrested Kali and sent him to a rehabilitation center. Later, Kali ran away from the rehabilitation center, and became involved in the construction of D Block as a laborer. One day, Kali was caught sneaking into the women's bathroom by several students. The students beat him up before handing him over to the police, but Kali manages to escape. From then, he begins to kidnap and kill girls at the university.

Arul, his friends and Maya find Kali's entry point into the hostel. They investigate the forest, but cannot find anything, and Arul turns to old issues of the college magazine for clues. Later, Arul sees some photos taken by his friend at the forest and realizes that Kali had been standing behind them, and that his next target is Maya. He tries to warn Maya but fails, and he sees Kali pushing Maya from the D Block terrace. Maya's death is ruled as suicide.

Arul tells his friends and Shruti that five of Kali's eight victims had been bharatanatyam dancers. At his insistence, Shruti make interviews all of the classical dancers in the hostel and finds out that one of the girls has recently seen him. Arul and his friends believe that she is Kali's next target. That night, Arul and his friends enter the D Block to protect the dancer with the help of their friend, Ria. However, when they find out that the girl has a short hair, Arul realizes that Kali doesn't target classical dancers, but girls with long hair. At the same time, they find out that Kali has kidnapped Shruti.

Arul and his friends find Shruti in the forest and bring her back to the hostel. They inform the police and wait for them to arrive, but an enraged Kali returns to the hostel and tries to kidnap Shruti. Arul, his friends and their seniors struggle to stop him. All of the girls in D Block join forces to fight against Kali and trample him to death.

Cast

Production

Development 
In February 2020, YouTuber Vijay Kumar Rajendran (of Eruma Saani fame) announced his directional debut in a film starring Arulnithi in the lead and produced by cinematographer Aravinnd Singh under the banner MNM Films with the tentative title as #Arulnithi15 (the actor's 15th film in leading role). The film marked Arulnithi's fifth project with Aravinnd Singh after Demonte Colony (2015), Aarathu Sinam (2016), Iravukku Aayiram Kangal (2018) and K-13 (2019).

Casting 
Avantika Mishra was cast in the film as the female lead opposite to Arulnithi. Apart from the direction, Vijay Kumar Rajendran was also acting in the film in a prominent role. It was reported that Arulnithi was playing the role of a college student and to prepare for his role, he took some weight loss.

Music

The songs were composed by Ron Ethan Yohann and Kaushik Krish while the latter did the film score. The first single from the film titled "Ice Katti Kuruvi" was released by Think Music India on 4 February 2022.

Release

Theatrical 
The title of the film and the first look poster of the film were unveiled by director Pandiraj via his Twitter account on 21 July 2021. In January 2022, the film was given a "U/A" certificate by Central Board of Film Certification and the trailer was released by Nelson Dilipkumar, Lokesh Kanagaraj and Venkat Prabhu.

Home media
The satellite rights of the film were sold to Colors Tamil. The movie was made available to stream on Amazon Prime Video from August 1 2022.

Reception

Critical response 
Logesh Balachandran of The Times of India, rated the film to be 2 out of 5 and stated "The technical aspects of the film look very average and don't really elevate the mood of the film. D Block marks the debut of Eruma Saani Vijay Kumar, a popular YouTuber, and he has a long way to go in terms of writing for the screen." Vignesh Madhu of Cinema Express gave the film 3 out of 5 stars and wrote "D Block has more such moments to prove that 'Eruma Saani' Vijay Kumar is a promising filmmaker in the making. If only he had paid more attention to making the first half more interesting with less focus on the comedy and romance portions, this film would have been a wholesome thriller." Indiaglitz rated the film to be 2.25 out of 5 and stated "Go for this one if you fancy psycho thrillers and if your expectations are minimal."S Subhakeerthana of OTTplay gave 1.5 stars out 5 and stated that "Please binge-watch your favourite film on Netflix instead of wasting your time on D Block.".India herald critic  gave 3 out 5 stars and wrote that "The issue with D Block is that it renders its opponent unbeatable in every manner, but his narrative is uninteresting and does little to justify his superiority"

Box office 
D Block collected a total of ₹16 crore. The film was a box office success

References

External links 
 

2022 films
2022 action thriller films
Indian psychological thriller films
2020s Tamil-language films